Presidential elections were held in Dahomey on 5 May 1968. Basile Adjou won with 84% of the vote, but the results were invalidated due to insufficient voter turnout (turnout was just 26%). A referendum on 28 July resulted in Émile Derlin Zinsou being confirmed as president.

Results

References

Presidential elections in Benin
Dahomey
1968 in the Republic of Dahomey
Annulled elections
May 1968 events in Africa